The 1917–18 Colgate Raiders men's basketball team represented Colgate University during the 1917–18 college men's basketball season. The head coach was Walt Hammond, coaching the Raiders in his fifth season. The team had finished with a final record of 9–12. The team captain was Mark Smith.

Schedule

|-

References

Colgate Raiders men's basketball seasons
Colgate
Colgate
Colgate